Waggy was an unincorporated community on the border of Braxton and Nicholas counties, West Virginia, United States, located just west of the Webster County line on the road from Bays to Erbacon and a logging railroad from Ramp Run. It was also known as Rose Hill.

The community was named after Henry Waggy, a businessperson in the lumber industry.

References 

Unincorporated communities in West Virginia
Unincorporated communities in Braxton County, West Virginia
Unincorporated communities in Nicholas County, West Virginia